Dennis Modzaka (born 2 August 2000) is a Ghanaian professional footballer who plays as forward for Ghanaian Premier League side Bechem United F.C.

Career 
Modzaka started his career with Bechem United. He was promoted to the senior team in September 2019 during 2019–20 season. On 29 December 2019, he made his professional debut after being named in the starting line-up and playing 77 minutes of a 2–0 victory over Elmina Sharks. He went on to play six league matches before the season was cancelled due to the outbreak of the COVID-19 in Ghana.

He scored his debut goal during the 2020–21 season, after scoring the second goal in the 21st minute to secure an emphatic 4–0 victory over rivals Aduana Stars.

References

External links 

 

Living people
2000 births
Association football forwards
Ghanaian footballers
Bechem United F.C. players
Ghana Premier League players